Bilaspur Road railway station is a small railway station in Rampur district, Uttar Pradesh. Its code is BLQR. It serves Bilaspur city. The station consists of a single platform. The platform is not well sheltered. It lacks many facilities including water and sanitation.

Trains 
 Ranikhet Express
 Kathgodam Express
 Bagh Express
 Kathgodam–Moradabad Passenger
 Uttarakhand Sampark Kranti Express
 Kathgodam–Jammu Tawi Garib Rath Express
 New Delhi–Kathgodam Shatabdi Express

References

Railway stations in Rampur district
Moradabad railway division